Arcigay is Italy's first and largest worldwide gay organisation. The association was first founded as a local association in Palermo in 1980, then nationally established in Bologna in 1985. The organisation became known throughout Italy for its campaign for civil unions. The President of Arcigay is Luciano Lopopolo;. Franco Grillini is honorary president.

Arcigay has often protested against the Vatican's opposition to homosexuality and LGBT rights.

History

The creation of Arcigay
The first nucleus of what later became Arcigay was formed in Palermo on December 9, 1980 as ARCI Gay, partly on the emotional wave of a demonstration organized in Giarre for a crime that had occurred about two months earlier. Two young men, Giorgio Agatino Giammona and Antonio Galatola, were killed on October 17 with a bullet each in the head for being gay. It was Antonio's 13-year-old nephew who shot, forced by the two in order to escape the "shame" that their condition as homosexuals procured for themselves and their families.

After Palermo in many other cities in Italy people started to reunite in small groups. Nonetheless, the national association to which everyone referred did not yet exist as an independent entity, but referred to the ARCI association which grouped together various Italian cultural entities and for the first time gave space to issues pertaining to the homosexual world. Among the first leaders of those movements we need to mention Massimo Milani, Gino Campanella and Marco Bisceglia, tha latter being a priest who was already an adherent of so-called liberation theology, a homosexual himself and a forerunner of gay marriage in Italy, having celebrated in 1975 a so-called "union of conscience" religious union between two men. This caused the priest a suspension from his Catholic Church.

In 1982, again in Palermo, a national meeting of ARCI Gay was held, considered the association's first congress in that it was attended by the national leadership of the ARCI; two years later ARCI Gay posed the problem of institutionalizing and stabilizing its presence throughout the country, which led to the first constituent summit held in late 1984.

Organisation 
Arcigay is divided into several subsidiary associations scattered throughout Italy. The creator and first president of M.I.A. Arcigay Imperia is the Italian mathematician Marco Antei Here we present the list updated to 2022:

Ancona - Arcigay Comunitas Ancona - Comitato Territoriale Arcigay
Aosta - Arcigay Valle d'Aosta Queer VdA - Comitato Territoriale Arcigay
Arezzo - Arcigay Arezzo "Chimera Arcobaleno" - Comitato territoriale Arcigay
Asti - Love is Love - Associazione Aderente Arcigay
Avellino - Avellino - Associazione Aderente Arcigay
Bari - Arcigay Bari "L'arcobaleno del Levante" - Comitato territoriale Arcigay
Barletta-Andria-Trani - Arcigay Bat "Le Mine Vaganti" - Comitato territoriale Arcigay
Bergamo - Arcigay Bergamo "Cives" - Comitato territoriale Arcigay
Bologna - Cassero LGBT Center - Comitato territoriale Arcigay
Bolzano - Centaurus Arcigay dell'Alto Adige Südtirol - Comitato territoriale Arcigay
Brescia - Arcigay Orlando Brescia APS - Comitato territoriale Arcigay
Campania - Arcigay Campania - Coordinamento Regionale Arcigay
Caserta - Rain Arcigay Caserta - Comitato territoriale Arcigay
Castelli Romani - Castelli Romani - Associazione Aderente Arcigay
Catania - Arcigay Pegaso Catania - Comitato territoriale Arcigay
Chieti - Arcigay Chieti - Sylvia Rivera - Comitato territoriale Arcigay
Como - Arcigay Como - Comitato Territoriale Arcigay
Cosenza - Arcigay EOS Cosenza - Comitato territoriale Arcigay
Cremona - Arcigay Cremona "La Rocca" - Comitato territoriale Arcigay
Cuneo - Arcigay "Granda Queer" Cuneo - Comitato territoriale Arcigay
Ferrara - Arcigay Ferrara - Comitato territoriale Arcigay
Florence - Arcigay Firenze Altre Sponde - Comitato Territoriale Arcigay
Foggia - Arcigay Foggia "Le Bigotte" - Comitato territoriale Arcigay
Frosinone - Frosinone - Comitato Territoriale Arcigay
Genova - Arcigay Genova - Approdo Lilia Mulas A.P.S. - Comitato territoriale Arcigay
Imperia - M.I.A. Arcigay Imperia. Comitato territoriale Arcigay
L'Aquila - Arcigay "Massimo Consoli" L'Aquila - Comitato territoriale Arcigay
Latina - SEIcomeSEI - Comitato territoriale Arcigay
Le fate ignoranti - Le fate ignoranti - Associazione Aderente Arcigay
Lecce - Arcigay Salento - Comitato territoriale Arcigay
Livorno - L.E.D. Libertà e Diritti - Comitato territoriale Arcigay
Mantova - Arcigay "La Salamandra" Mantova - Comitato territoriale Arcigay
Messina - Arcigay "Makwan" Messina - Comitato territoriale Arcigay
Milan - Centro d’Iniziativa Gay - Comitato territoriale Arcigay
Modena - Arcigay Modena "Matthew Shepard" (ODV) - Comitato territoriale Arcigay
Molise - Arcigay Molise "Lambda Identità Libere" - Comitato Territoriale Arcigay
Naples - Arcigay "Antinoo" Napoli - Comitato territoriale Arcigay
Padova - Arcigay Tralaltro Padova - Comitato territoriale Arcigay
Palermo - Arcigay Palermo - Comitato territoriale Arcigay
Pavia - Coming-Aut LGBTI+ Community Center - Arcigay Pavia - Comitato territoriale Arcigay
Pesaro Urbino - Arcigay Agorà - Comitato territoriale Arcigay
Pescara - Mazì - Comitato Territoriale Arcigay
Piacenza - Arcigay Piacenza Lambda - Comitato territoriale Arcigay
Pisa - Pinkriot Arcigay Pisa - Comitato territoriale Arcigay
Potenza - Arcigay Basilicata "Marco Bisceglia" - Comitato territoriale Arcigay
Prato Pistoia - Arcigay Prato Pistoia l'Asterisco - Comitato territoriale Arcigay
Ragusa - Arcigay Ragusa - Comitato territoriale Arcigay
Ravenna - Arcigay Ravenna Elio Venturi - Comitato territoriale Arcigay
Reggio Calabria - Arcigay IDM "I Due Mari", Reggio Calabria - Comitato territoriale Arcigay
Reggio Emilia - Arcigay Reggio Emilia "Gioconda" - Comitato territoriale Arcigay
Rieti - Rieti LGBT+ - Comitato Territoriale Arcigay
Rimini - Arcigay Rimini "Alan Turing" - Comitato territoriale Arcigay
Rome - Arcigay Roma Gruppo Ora - Comitato territoriale Arcigay
Roma - Divine Ostia - Associazione Aderente Arcigay
Rovigo - Arcigay Rovigo "Politropia" - Comitato territoriale Arcigay
Salerno - Arcigay "Marcella di Folco" Salerno - Comitato territoriale Arcigay
Savona - Arcigay Savona "APERTAMENTE" - Comitato territoriale Arcigay
Siena - Movimento Pansessuale APS - Comitato Territoriale Arcigay
Siracusa - Arcigay Siracusa - Comitato territoriale Arcigay
Taranto - Stambopoli - Comitato Territoriale Arcigay
Teramo - Arcigay Teramo - Associazione Aderente Arcigay
Turin - Arcigay Torino "Ottavio Mai" - Comitato territoriale Arcigay
Torino - Casa Arcobaleno Torino - Associazione Aderente Arcigay
Trento - Arcigay del Trentino - Comitato territoriale Arcigay
Trieste - Arcigay Arcobaleno ODV Trieste Gorizia - Comitato territoriale Arcigay
Udine - Arcigay Friuli ODV - Comitato territoriale Arcigay
Varese - Arcigay Varese - Comitato territoriale Arcigay
Verbania - Arcigay Nuovi Colori ONLUS - Comitato territoriale Arcigay
Vercelli - Arcigay Rainbow Vercelli - Valsesia - Comitato territoriale Arcigay
Verona - Pianeta Milk - Verona Lgbt* Center - Arcigay/Arci - Comitato territoriale Arcigay
Vicenza - Arcigay Vicenza APS - Comitato territoriale Arcigay
Viterbo - Viterbo - Associazione Aderente Arcigay

See also

LGBT rights in Italy
List of LGBT rights organisations

References

External links

LGBT political advocacy groups in Italy
LGBT organisations in Italy
LGBT history in Italy